The Party of Bible-abiding Christians (PBC) was a conservative evangelical minor right-wing political party in Germany. It was founded in 1989 during a convent of the Federation of Pentecostal Churches to serve as political arm of the Christian right in Germany. It was against same-sex marriage and legality of abortion. It supported a reference to God in the European Constitution and it strongly supported Israel. In March 2015, the PBC merged with the Party for Labour, Environment and Family (AUF) into the Alliance C – Christians for Germany.

Most members were from Württemberg or Saxony and were members or sympathizers of what Germans call "Freikirche" (Free Church), i.e., Protestants from Pentecostal and Charismatic sects, which are not affiliated with the large Lutheran Evangelical Church in Germany.

The party's success, however, was very limited on the federal and state levels of government because it never reached the "5% hurdle" of votes cast necessary to get into the parliaments in Germany's system of proportional representation. In the last federal election the PBC participated (2013), the party achieved 0.0 percent of votes.

By contrast, the conservative Christian Democratic Union and Christian Social Union in Bavaria are powerful political forces in Germany (based on the number of votes and offices held). They differ greatly from the former PBC though in accepting secularization and being traditionally close to the Evangelical Church in Germany and the Roman Catholic Church.

The party was a member of the European Christian Political Movement (EPCM).

Election results

Federal Parliament (Bundestag)

References

Defunct political parties in Germany
Christian political parties in Germany
Conservative parties in Germany
Organizations that oppose LGBT rights
Protestant political parties
Political parties established in 1989
Political parties disestablished in 2015
Pentecostalism
Christian fundamentalism
1989 establishments in Germany
2015 disestablishments in Germany